Yoel García Luis (born November 25, 1973, in Nueva Gerona, Isla de la Juventud) is a Cuban triple jumper who he won the silver medal at the 2000 Summer Olympics, equalling his personal best with 17.47.  His first Olympics was the one of 1996, where he finished 20th in the qualification round.

Competition record

Personal Best
Indoor 17.62 m
Outdoor 17.47 m

External links 
 
 sports-reference

1973 births
Living people
Cuban male triple jumpers
Athletes (track and field) at the 1995 Pan American Games
Athletes (track and field) at the 1996 Summer Olympics
Athletes (track and field) at the 2000 Summer Olympics
People from Nueva Gerona
Olympic athletes of Cuba
Olympic silver medalists for Cuba
Medalists at the 2000 Summer Olympics
Olympic silver medalists in athletics (track and field)
Pan American Games medalists in athletics (track and field)
Pan American Games bronze medalists for Cuba
World Athletics Indoor Championships winners
Medalists at the 1995 Pan American Games